Invasion is a 2014 Panamanian documentary film written and directed by Abner Benaim about the 1989 US invasion. It was selected as the Panamanian entry for the Best Foreign Language Film at the 87th Academy Awards, but was not nominated. It was the first time that Panama submitted a film for the Best Foreign Language Oscar.

Synopsis 
The film interviews many Panama residents who were affected by the invasion of Panama in 1989. The film also interviewed Manuel Noriega, which was very controversial to some of the viewers, as he was serving a life sentence.

Reception 
The film won the Best Documentary Audience Award, and the MasterCard Central America and Caribbean Audience Award, at the Panama film festival.

See also
 List of submissions to the 87th Academy Awards for Best Foreign Language Film
 List of Panamanian submissions for the Academy Award for Best Foreign Language Film

References

External links
 

2014 films
2014 documentary films
Panamanian documentary films
2010s Spanish-language films
Documentary films about United States history
Documentary films about American politics
Documentary films about war
Panama–United States relations
Films shot in Panama
Documentary films about Latin America
2010s American films